The Chapel of St. Mary the Virgin and St. Everilda, in the village of Everingham in the East Riding of Yorkshire, England, is an impressive Italianate-style Roman Catholic chapel within the Diocese of Middlesbrough. The chapel is owned by the Guest family and is noteworthy as a Grade I listed building, with a fine organ.

History

The impressive stuccoed classical exterior almost dwarfs the adjacent red-brick Everingham Hall, which was designed by John Carr and built between 1757 and 1764 for William Haggerston Constable.

His descendant, William Constable-Maxwell, 10th Lord Herries of Terregles, from an old recusant family, built the chapel between 1836 and 1839, following passage of the Roman Catholic Relief Act 1829.

Once the act was passed, a number of Roman Catholic benefactors offered their assistance, and a large number of churches and chapels were built in the ensuing years. Yorkshire had a long history of recusancy and a large number of families had remained Catholic long after the Reformation, indeed there were entire recusant villages. Everingham was one of these, and the Catholic Church of St. Everilda was built in the grounds of the Hall. Designed in Italy by a young Roman architect, Agostino Giorgioli, its building was supervised by John Harper of York and was modeled on the Maison Dieu at Nîmes.

The church features lofty Corinthian columns on either side of the nave supporting an entableture which in turn supports a deeply coffered barrel ceiling.  The apsidal sanctuary has matching Corinthian pilasters and an ingeniously designed half dome ceiling.  Around the nave are spectacular statues of the apostles and there are statues of Our Lady and St Everilda in the sanctuary.

The church was consecrated on 9 July 1839 by Bishop John Briggs, the vicar apostolic of the Northern District, assisted by Andrew Carruthers (titular bishop of Ceramus), John Murdoch (titular bishop of Castabala), James Gillis (titular bishop of Limyra) and thirty-six other clergymen. The ceremony lasted nearly seven hours. A Pontifical Mass was celebrated the following day.

Interior decoration

The exterior is unexceptional, but the interior is magnificent, with a long hall flanked with Corinthian columns, and niches with lifesize plaster statues of the Apostles and bas-reliefs of episodes in the life of Christ by Luigi Bozzoni of Carrara. The building is barrel-vaulted, ending in an apse behind the altar, which is of marble inset with panels of polished granite and porphyry. Plenty of 'faux' marbling and real gold leaf adds to the effect, and the acoustics are noteworthy.

The organ, by Charles Allen, is contemporary with the chapel, and is on a high west gallery, under the barrel vault. English classical organ Despite the small specification, the organ is laid out grandly and occupies a big mahogany case with a gilded front (the facade starts at 8' C – the four lowest Open Diapason pipes are inside). The Great Organ is in the obvious place at impost level, and the tiny swell-box is above and behind, with the Pedal Pipes on either side below it. The entire base of the organ is occupied by an enormous double-rise reservoir, about twelve feet by six.

The chapel today 

The Roman Catholic parish of Everingham was closed in 2004.

Cemetery

There is an attached Roman Catholic cemetery which contains, amongst others, the war grave of an East Yorkshire Regiment soldier of the First World War.

See also
Grade I listed churches in the East Riding of Yorkshire

References

External links

Photograph of the exterior
Photographs of the interior
History of the organ
Recording of the organ with brief history of the church
History of music at Everingham
National Archives entries

Grade I listed churches in the East Riding of Yorkshire
Churches completed in 1839
19th-century Roman Catholic church buildings in the United Kingdom
Roman Catholic churches in the East Riding of Yorkshire
Roman Catholic Diocese of Middlesbrough